Denis Francoeur (born February 17, 1963) is a Canadian  ice hockey coach. He is currently the assistant general manager of the Baie-Comeau Drakkar in the Quebec Major Junior Hockey League (QMJHL).

Between 1987 and 2005, Francoeur served as a head coach for the Shawinigan Cataractes of the Quebec Major Junior Hockey League (QMJHL) where he won the 2000–01 Ron Lapointe Trophy as the QMJHL coach of the year. He also coached the Acadie-Bathurst Titan during the  2007–08 QMJHL season.

Awards and honours

References

External links
Denis Francoeur's staff ptofile at Eliteprospects.com

1963 births
Living people
Acadie–Bathurst Titan coaches
Canadian ice hockey coaches
Shawinigan Cataractes coaches